Boureima is a given name. Here is a list of notable people, with this name:

Boureima Badini (born 1956), Burkinabé politician
Boureima Hassane Bandé (born 1998), Burkinabé football player
Boureima Maïga (born 1983), Burkinabé football player
Boureima Ouattara (born 1984), Burkinabé football player
Boureima Zongo (born 16 March 1972), Burkinabé former footballer

See Also
Bourem Airport

African masculine given names